Manuel Cabrera (born 30 January 1983) is a Chilean long distance runner. He competed in the men's marathon at the 2017 World Championships in Athletics.

References

External links

1983 births
Living people
Chilean male long-distance runners
Chilean male marathon runners
World Athletics Championships athletes for Chile
Place of birth missing (living people)